The 2013 Seddon earthquake measured 6.5 on the  scale and was centred in New Zealand's Cook Strait, around  east of the town of Seddon in Marlborough. Only minor injuries were reported. Several aftershocks occurred during 21–29 July.

The Seddon earthquake is considered the first of an earthquake doublet, with a second earthquake of similar magnitude occurring on 16 August 2013.

Earthquake

Foreshocks
The earthquake was preceded by a series of foreshocks, the largest of which had a magnitude of 5.7.

Below is a list of all foreshocks magnitudes 5.0 and above that occurred in the region between 19 July 2013 and 21 July 2013.

Aftershocks
The earthquake generated a series of aftershocks, the largest of which had a magnitude of 5.4.

Below is a list of all aftershocks magnitudes 5.0 and above that occurred in the region between 21 July 2013 and 2 August 2013.

Damage
The quake resulted in varying degrees of damage to thirty-five buildings within the Wellington CBD with glass from broken windows falling onto the main thoroughfares of Lambton Quay, Featherston Street, and Willis Street. Damage was also caused in Paraparaumu, Wainuiomata, Porirua and the Hutt Valley in the North Island.

The Wellington Region emergency management office was activated on the evening of 21 July, as were those in the lower part of the North Island. On 22 July parts of Wellington's central business district were closed to the public to allow for inspections to buildings with damaged and potentially dangerous façades.

Four people were injured in the quake, which lasted for 20 seconds, blowing out windows, cracking concrete and swaying buildings.

See also
List of earthquakes in 2013
List of earthquakes in New Zealand 
Marlborough Fault System
1848 Marlborough earthquake
2013 Lake Grassmere earthquake
2016 Kaikoura earthquake

References

External links
 Cook Strait earthquakes, science update – GNS Science
 

2013 earthquakes
2013 Seddon
Seddon earthquake
Doublet earthquakes
July 2013 events in New Zealand
2013 disasters in New Zealand